Joint Rumi Spelling (ERB) is the most recent spelling reform of the Latin-derived Rumi script, used to write the Malay language. The spelling reform was jointly initiated by the governments of Malaysia and Indonesia, and it was adopted in 1972 to officially replace the Za'aba Spelling that was previously standard in Malaysia, Singapore and Brunei.

Historically, Indonesia and Malaysia — the two largest Malay-speaking countries, in that order — were divided between two colonial administrations, under the Dutch and British empires respectively. Thus, the development of spelling systems for Rumi script were greatly influenced by the orthographies of their respective colonial tongues. Shortly after the end of Indonesia-Malaysia confrontation in 1966, a common spelling system became among the first items on the agenda of a detente between the two countries.

The new spelling system, known as 'New Rumi Spelling' in Malaysia and 'Perfected Spelling System' in Indonesia, was officially announced in both countries on 16 August 1972. Although the representations of speech sounds are now largely identical in the Indonesian and Malaysian varieties, a number of minor spelling differences remain.

Background
The first known attempt to use Latin script or 'Rumi', for writing Malay words was by Duarte Barbosa in 1518 in Melaka, shortly after the conquest of 1511. Few years later in 1522, the world's first Malay-European dictionary was compiled by Antonio Pigafetta, an Italian companion of Ferdinand Magellan. This was subsequently followed by many other European traders, adventurers, explorers and scholars who invented their own Rumi spelling systems. Among notable Rumi spelling systems that existed before the 20th century were the orthographies of Cornelis de Houtman (1595), Davidis Haex (1631), Thomas Bowrey (1701), J.Howison (1800), William Marsden (1812), Claudius Thomsen (1820), John Crawfurd (1848), Straits Settlements (1878), Frank Swettenham (1881), and William Edward Maxwell (1882). All these systems were mainly developed by using the method of transliteration from Jawi (Arabic-derived Malay script). The divergences of various spelling systems that existed in colonial Malaya, necessitates the need for a commonly accepted spelling system. A major orthographic reform was initiated by a British scholar administrator, Richard James Wilkinson in 1904, from which the Wilkinson spelling was introduced, and became the official system widely used in all British colonies and protectorates in Malaya, Singapore and Borneo. In 1924, another reform was devised by a notable Malay grammarian, Za'ba, which later adopted in all schools from the 1930s onwards. After the short-lived Fajar Asia system used during Japanese occupation (1941-1945), the Third Malay Congress introduced the Congress system in 1956. The innovative Congress System gained a widespread currency through published works, but remain impractical for the use of the masses. In the meantime, the schools and the government publications continued using the Za'aba system. Hence, the general public became increasingly confused with the existence of different spelling systems. As a result, it was common during this era to find several spelling systems concurrently used in printed media and individual writings.

In 1959, the Federation of Malaya and Indonesia signed a cultural agreement, which included the implementation of a common spelling system. The system agreed to in this agreement was known as 'Melindo System'. However, due to its similarity with the Congress system which proven impractical, and the ensuing diplomatic tension between Indonesia and Malaya over the formation of Malaysia, the system was never implemented or even published. Following the end of Indonesia-Malaysia confrontation in 1966, a common spelling system became among the first items on the agenda of a detente between the two countries. Language experts from both countries began to work on formulating a new system that was practical and above all accepted by the two parties concerned. Six years later, on 16 August 1972, the common spelling system, which came to be known as 'New Rumi Spelling' in Malaysia and 'Perfected Spelling System' in Indonesia, was officially announced by Prime Minister Tun Abdul Razak in Malaysia and President Suharto in Indonesia.

Soon after, another Malay-speaking country, Brunei, decided to adopt the new common system to replace the Malaysian Za'aba System, previously used in the country. Although Singapore does not use Malay as much as its neighbours, due to its four-language policy (consisting of English, Mandarin, Malay and Tamil), its Malay language developments had always been closely linked with those of Malaysia. There has never been anything official on Singapore's part on its stand on the new spelling, but implementation of this system has taken place as evidenced by publications in Malay produced in Singapore.

Implementation
A grace period of five years was given in both countries for the people to get used to the new system. In Malaysia this meant that students were not penalised for making mistakes in spelling words according to the old systems. However, a rigorous programme was undertaken by the government's Language and Literacy Agency (Dewan Bahasa dan Pustaka) to see to the implementation of the new spelling system by giving special classes to the people, especially teachers and administrators, on how to spell their language according to the new spelling system. The grace period also allowed the publishers to dispose of their old stocks and to publish revised editions and new titles in the new spelling. Names of roads, places, and institutions had to undergo a change in appearance, using the new spelling system.

The system

Removal of diacritics

Schwa
The Za'aba system uses the letter  to stand for  while letter  stands for the  sound. The new system, guided by the Wilkinson system, has discarded them and uses  for both the vowels concerned.

Apostrophes
In the old systems, the apostrophe was placed before a vowel, if the vowel is syllable-initial, to indicate the pharyngeal fricative which appeared in loanwords from Arabic. However, Malay does not have this phoneme in its inventory. Most Malays actualise this sound as a glottal stop. Since syllable- and word-initial vowels in Malay are always accompanied by the glottal stop, the apostrophe to indicate the Arabic pharyngeal fricative was discarded, so spelling certain Arabic loanwords with one grapheme less, as:

Hyphens
The use of the hyphen became significantly less with the new spelling system. The old spelling systems were liberal in the use of the hyphen e.g. between the affix di- or the postpositional emphatic word lah or the clitic form nya and the root word, or between certain prepositions and the nouns that follow them. In the new spelling, the hyphen in the first set of contexts is removed and the components are written as a complete or whole word; in the second context, the removal of the hyphen results in two distinct words, one a preposition and the other a noun. In the new system, the hyphen remains in use between components of reduplicated words, like menari-nari ('keeps on dancing') and rumah-rumah ('houses').

The choice of graphemes
For the Malaysian  and Indonesian , a new grapheme was agreed on: . Previous to the new spelling system,  did not have the status of a grapheme either in Malaysia or in Indonesia. The common spelling system has given it graphemic status. In Malaysia, this grapheme stood for the voiceless palato-alveolar affricate while in Indonesia it was for the velar fricative .

A number of graphemes remain in use in Malaysian spelling, and in turn adopted by the Indonesians. For example, the Indonesians agreed to adopt Malaysian  for the voiced alveolopalatal affricate spelt  in English. When the Indonesians accepted , they also accepted  in place of their , for the  sound. The  as a component in certain graphemes is also retained in Malaysian spelling, and it indicates 'gutturalisation'. Here, it is worth mentioning that the Indonesian side had agreed to the grapheme  for /x/ to replace their .

Reduplication
In Malay, reduplication is very productive as a morphological process. There are three types of reduplication in Malay: the reduplication of the first syllable of the root, the reduplication of the stem of a complex word, and the reduplication of the whole word, be it a simple or complex word. In the old spelling systems both in Malaysia and Indonesia, the first type of reduplication was spelt in toto, but the character  was used to indicate the reduplication of the second and third types. In the reduplication of the whole word, the character  was placed at the end of the word, for example, rumah2 was read as rumah-rumah ('houses'), makan2 as makan-makan ('to while away the time eating').

The writing of the reduplication of the complex word with the character  was not neat and consistent. The use of  made it possible to write the same word in more than one way. One was to separate the components with a hyphen and place  after the component that was duplicated (see ii below), and the other was to place  at the end of the whole word (see iii below).

Both ii and iii above should be read as bermain-main. The first method facilitated reading, but it violated the rule of writing complex words with affixes, namely that an affix should be written together with the stem so that the word appears as a complete whole. As for the second method, while it observed the morphological rule, it caused difficulty in reading. Speakers, especially non-native ones, were prone to reading the second example above as a total reduplication bermain-bermain which is ungrammatical. Although native speakers, with their native competence, may not read bermain2 as a total reduplication, because the total reduplication of forms falling into this pattern does not occur in the language, there are other patterns where native speakers themselves find difficulty in deciding whether the written word with the character  represents total reduplication or only that of the stem. An example is sekali2. As a total reduplication, sekali-sekali, it means 'once in a while', whereas as a word which undergoes reduplication only at the stem, sekali-kali, it means '(not) ... at all'.

The use of the character  was economical in nature. It was a form of shorthand in writing the cumbersome reduplicated word. However, facilitation in reading and mastering the language was the overriding factor in discarding it altogether as a shorthand symbol for reduplication. This makes the physical writing slower but it has brought simplification to the learning system.

New consonant clusters
The old spelling systems in Malaysia and Indonesia did not recognise the existence of consonant clusters at the word-initial and word-final positions. Loanwords which have such clusters are mainly from English. They were spelt, based on the established rule of Malay phonology that the syllable structure consists of only a single consonant as its onset and its coda. Therefore, the cluster at the beginning of the word was neutralised by inserting a vowel, usually a schwa, between its components.

There were certain words which showed a difference in the perceptions of the Indonesians and the Malaysians on the clusters concerned, viz. on the component that was more significant and should be retained.

With its flexibility rule, the new spelling system has admitted clusters in the initial and final positions of the word. This has facilitated the borrowing of technical terms from English for the various sciences. However, those words which have existed for a long time in the Malay language with one or two components decapitated have been allowed to remain, so as not to cause too much destandardisation. Among those which did not undergo a change in form by having their clusters reinstated are the Malaysian examples of komunis ('communist'), rekod ('record'), moden ('modern').

Word-final schwas in loanwords
As Malay is essentially disyllabic in nature, monosyllabic words with final consonant clusters in English are assimilated by giving them a disyllabic appearance, namely by placing the grapheme  at the end of the word. For example, kuspa from 'cusp', kalka from 'calc'.

This has greatly facilitated the work of the various terminology committees of the Dewan Bahasa dan Pustaka, already mentioned, in assimilating loanwords from other languages.

Acceptance of the final schwa does not mean acceptance of something foreign. The final  for schwa is meant only for loanwords.

See also
 Republican Spelling System, for more information on a similar spelling system used in Indonesian in older times.

References

Bibliography

Malay language
Spelling reform
Writing systems introduced in 1972